Kakrapar Atomic Power Station is a nuclear power station in India, which lies in the proximity of Mandvi, Surat and Tapi river in the state of Gujarat.

Phase I
Phase I consist two 220 MW pressurised water reactor with heavy water as moderator (PHWR).  KAPS-1 went critical on 3 September 1992 and began commercial electricity production a few months later on 6 May 1993. KAPS-2 went critical on 8 January 1995 and began commercial production on 1 September 1995. In January 2003, CANDU Owners Group (COG) declared KAPS as the best performing pressurised heavy water reactor.

KAPS-2 was shut down after a coolant channel leak in July 2015 and a similar issue forced the shutdown of KAPS-1 in March 2016. After a replacement of coolant channels and feeder tubes, KAPS-2 attained criticality in September 2018. Maintenance on KAPS-1 was completed ahead of schedule and was brought to operation on 19 May 2019.

The construction costs were originally estimated to be ₹382.52 crore; the plant was finally finished at a price of ₹1,335 crore.

Phase II
In 2007 the Indian government approved outline plans to build two indigenously-designed IPHWR-700 reactors, with two sister reactors a little later at Rajasthan Atomic Power Station. In 2009 approval was confirmed, and site preparation was completed by August 2010. The first concrete for Kakrapar 3 and 4 was in November 2010 and March 2011 respectively with operation originally expected by early and late 2018 respectively.

The project over-ran largely due to tuning of the IPHWR-700 design and slow delivery of supplies. Operation is now expected by October 2020 and September 2021 respectively. Unit 3 achieved the first criticality on 22 July 2020 and is expected to begin commercial operation by December 2022.

Unit 3 was connected to the grid on 10 January 2021.

Units

Incidents 
 1998 KAPS-1 was switched off because of a leakage in the cooling loop for 66 days.
 10 March 2004 the (at the time of) supply for the control rods were irreparably damaged during maintenance work. In response, poisons were added to the system and the reactor was shut off.
 On 22 August 2006 it was reported by village inhabitants the area around the power station had been penetrated. A search by the police did not result in any findings.
 On 11 March 2016, KAPS-1 automatically shut down due to a leak of heavy coolant water, leaving both reactors non-operational. The leak was plugged ten days later. Corrosion and cracks were found on the coolant channel and similar corrosion spots were found in KAPS-2 which had been non-operational since July 2015 after a coolant channel leak. KAPS-2 attained criticality on 17 September 2018 after a replacement of its coolant channels and feeder tubes. KAPS-1 became operational ahead of schedule on 19 May 2019

See also 
 Nuclear power in India
 List of nuclear reactors#India

References

External links 

Nuclear power stations in Gujarat
Nuclear power stations with reactors under construction
1993 establishments in Gujarat